Crato Bütner (Sonneberg, 1616—1679) was a German Baroque composer who was kantor and organist in Danzig (Polish: Gdańsk), first at the hospital church of St Salvator, then at Gdańsk's oldest church, St Catherine's. His collection of baroque works disappeared in 1945.

Works, editions and recordings

Works
His works survive in manuscript in Stuttgart and in the Düben collection.
 songs in Georg Neumark's Lustwäldchen 1652, 1657
 songs in Johann Franck's Geistliche Sion
 Geistliche Konzerte, Hamburg 1651
 Psalm 147, Danzig 1661
 Te Deum a l2, Danzig 1662

Editions
 Edition: cantata Fürwahr, er trug unsere Krankheit
 Edition: Wollt Ihr wissen. Aria Sunamithica ... a voce sola con doi violini. Hofius.

Recordings
 Laudate Pueri Dominum Anna Jobrant, on Düben Delights Footprint 2009.

References

German organists
German male organists
German classical composers
German male classical composers
German Baroque composers
1616 births
1679 deaths
17th-century classical composers
17th-century male musicians